Chainsaw Records is an independent record label run by Donna Dresch that is devoted to Queercore bands. The label is in Portland, Oregon.

History
Chainsaw began life as a zine published by Donna Dresch in the late 1980s. Musicians and writers featured in the zine included Lois Maffeo, Jena von Brücker, Juliana Lueking, Candice Pederson, G.B. Jones and Larrybob. Chainsaw was one of the seminal queercore zines that, along with J.D.s and Homocore, helped define the movement.

"In 1991...Chainsaw developed from a zine into a record label. This began simply enough when she made a compilation cassette of her favourite bands and started to sell these while on tour with Fifth Column", writes Amy Spencer in DIY: The Rise of Lo-Fi Culture. In 1994 Chainsaw began to release LPs and singles, beginning with the release of The Fakes (featuring members of Bikini Kill, The Need and Nation of Ulysses ), the Frumpies and the first Team Dresch LP, Personal Best. This was followed by a co-release with Candy Ass Records, the double LP/CD compilation, Free to Fight. "The label established itself as a vital element of the queercore scene..." says Spencer, as Chainsaw then began to release records by a variety of queer mainly women artists. Of note is the fact that many bands, such as Sleater-Kinney, have been able to put out their initial recordings on the label. As well, the website for Chainsaw, and in particular its message board, have fostered a sense of community and provided a vehicle for expression by queers and music fans.

Chainsaw artists
 Davies vs. Dresch
 Excuse 17
 The Fakes
 The Frumpies
 Heartless Martin
 Heavens to Betsy
 Infinite Xs
 Kaia
 Longstocking
 The Need
 No. 2
 Show Me the Pink
 Sleater-Kinney
 Team Dresch
 Third Sex
 Tracy and the Plastics

See also 
 List of record labels

References

 Spencer, Amy; DIY: The Rise Of Lo-Fi Culture, Marion Boyars Publishers, London, UK,

External links 
 Official site chainsawrecords.com

American independent record labels
LGBT-related record labels
Zines
Queercore record labels
Record labels established in 1991
Oregon record labels
Privately held companies based in Oregon
Riot grrrl
1991 establishments in Oregon